San Baltazar Chichicapam is a town and municipality in Oaxaca in south-western Mexico. The municipality covers an area of 100.79 km². It is part of the Ocotlán District in the south of the Valles Centrales Region

As of 2005, the municipality had a total population of 2,716.

Municipal President Florencio San Germán died in 2020 during the COVID-19 pandemic in Mexico.

References

Municipalities of Oaxaca